Katunguru may refer to

 Katunguru, Tanzania, an administrative ward in Serengema District, Mwanza Region, Tanzania
 Katunguru, Uganda, a town in Rubirizi District, Western Region, Uganda.